What the Victorians Did for Us is a 2001 BBC documentary series that examines the impact of the Victorian era on modern society. It concentrates primarily on the scientific and social advances of the era, which bore the Industrial Revolution and set the standards for polite society today.

Episodes

Speed Merchants

Playing God

Rule Makers

 Victorians standardised the rules for association football, or soccer, based on a range of games already played, such as the Eton wall game.
 Walter Clopton Wingfield invented the game of lawn tennis, which allowed young men and women to socialise together, and to get more exercise than by playing the sedate game of croquet.
 Victorians set down rules for formal dining, and invented the fish knife. Mrs Beeton documented recipes and how to run a household.
 Florence Nightingale recorded extensive details of wounded soldiers in the Crimean War, and used these statistics to demonstrate to a Royal Commission the effectiveness of simple hygiene in reducing unnecessary deaths.
 In 1869, Dmitri Mendeleev formulated the periodic table of the chemical elements, including gaps where as-yet undiscovered elements would fit.
 Joseph Whitworth devised a series of standards for engineering, and built a rifle with an accurately-rifled barrel.
 Greenwich Observatory was used to define the official time for the whole country, and the zero line of longitude.

Crime and Punishment

Social Progress

Pleasure Seekers

Making It Big

Conquerors

External links 
 
 

Victorian era
2001 British television series debuts
2001 British television series endings
2000s British documentary television series
2000s British television miniseries
BBC television documentaries about history during the 18th and 19th centuries
English-language television shows